The Budapest Treaty on the International Recognition of the Deposit of Microorganisms for the Purposes of Patent Procedure, or Budapest Treaty, is an international treaty signed in Budapest, Hungary, on April 28, 1977. It entered into force on August 19, 1980, and was later amended on September 26, 1980. The treaty is administered by the World Intellectual Property Organization (WIPO).

Membership
As of April 2022, 86 countries are party to the Budapest Treaty. The accession to the Treaty is open to States party to the Paris Convention for the Protection of Industrial Property of 1883. The African Regional Industrial Property Organization (ARIPO), the Eurasian Patent Organization (EAPO) and the European Patent Organisation (EPO) have filed a declaration of acceptance under Article 9(1)(a) of the Treaty.

Content
The treaty allows "deposits of microorganisms at an international depositary authority to be recognized for the purposes of patent procedure". Usually, in order to meet the legal requirement of sufficiency of disclosure, patent applications and patents must disclose in their description the subject-matter of the invention in a manner sufficiently clear and complete to be carried out by the person skilled in the art (see also: reduction to practice). When an invention involves a microorganism, completely describing said invention in the description to enable third parties to carry it out is usually impossible. This is why, in the particular case of inventions involving microorganisms, a deposit of biological material must be made in a recognised institution.  The Budapest Treaty ensures that an applicant, i.e. a person who applies for a patent, needs not to deposit the biological material in all countries where he/she wants to obtain a patent. The applicant needs only to deposit the biological material at one recognised institution, and this deposit will be recognised in all countries party to the Budapest Treaty.

International depositary authority
The deposits are made at an international depositary authority (IDA) in accordance with the rules of the Treaty on or before the filing date of the complete patent application.  Article 7 of the Budapest treaty outlines the requirements for a facility to become an International Depositary Authority. As of July 23, 2018, there were 47 IDAs in approximately 25 countries worldwide.

Depositable subject matter
IDA's have accepted deposits for biological materials which do not fall within a literal interpretation of "microorganism".  The Treaty does not define what is meant by "microorganism."

The range of materials able to be deposited under the Budapest Treaty includes:
cells, for example, bacteria, fungi, eukaryotic cell lines, plant spores;
genetic vectors (such as plasmids or bacteriophage vectors or viruses) containing a gene or DNA fragments;
organisms used for expression of a gene (making the protein from the DNA).

There are many types of expression systems: bacterial; yeast; viral; plant or animal cell
cultures;
yeast, algae, protozoa, eukaryotic cells, cell lines, hybridomas, viruses, plant tissue cells, spores, and hosts containing materials such as vectors, cell organelles, plasmids, DNA, RNA, genes and chromosomes;
purified nucleic acids; or
deposits of materials not readily classifiable as microorganisms, such as "naked" DNA, RNA, or plasmids

See also
 List of parties to the Budapest Treaty
 American Type Culture Collection (ATCC)
 Centraalbureau voor Schimmelcultures (CBS)
 Gottfried Wilhelm Leibniz Scientific Community (DSMZ)
 European Collection of Authenticated Cell Cultures (ECACC)
 National Collection of Yeast Cultures (NCYC)
 World Federation for Culture Collections (WFCC)
 National Collection of Type Cultures (NCTC)
 National Collection of Industrial Food and Marine Bacteria (NCIMB)

References

External links
 Budapest Treaty  in the WIPO Lex database — official website of WIPO.
 The full text of the Budapest Treaty on the International Recognition of the Deposit of Micro-organisms for the Purposes of Patent Procedure (as amended on September 26, 1980) 
 Contracting States
 The Budapest Treaty and Australian Patents (IP Australia)
 A Short Guide to International IPR Treaties (US government)

History of Budapest
Patent law treaties
Science treaties
World Intellectual Property Organization treaties
Treaties concluded in 1977
Treaties entered into force in 1980
Treaties entered into by the European Patent Organisation
Treaties of Albania
Treaties of Armenia
Treaties of Australia
Treaties of Austria
Treaties of Azerbaijan
Treaties of Bahrain
Treaties of Belarus
Treaties of Belgium
Treaties of Brunei
Treaties of the People's Republic of Bulgaria
Treaties of Canada
Treaties of Chile
Treaties of the People's Republic of China
Treaties of Colombia
Treaties of Croatia
Treaties of Cuba
Treaties of the Czech Republic
Treaties of Czechoslovakia
Treaties of Denmark
Treaties of El Salvador
Treaties of Estonia
Treaties of Finland
Treaties of France
Treaties of West Germany
Treaties of Greece
Treaties of Guatemala
Treaties of Honduras
Treaties of the Hungarian People's Republic
Treaties of Iceland
Treaties of India
Treaties of Ireland
Treaties of Israel
Treaties of Italy
Treaties of Japan
Treaties of Kazakhstan
Treaties of North Korea
Treaties of South Korea
Treaties of Kyrgyzstan
Treaties of Latvia
Treaties of Liechtenstein
Treaties of Lithuania
Treaties of Luxembourg
Treaties of North Macedonia
Treaties of Mexico
Treaties of Moldova
Treaties of Monaco
Treaties of Montenegro
Treaties of Morocco
Treaties of the Netherlands
Treaties of Nicaragua
Treaties of Norway
Treaties of Panama
Treaties of the Philippines
Treaties of Poland
Treaties of Portugal
Treaties of Qatar
Treaties of Romania
Treaties of the Soviet Union
Treaties of Serbia and Montenegro
Treaties of Singapore
Treaties of Slovakia
Treaties of Slovenia
Treaties of South Africa
Treaties of Spain
Treaties of Sweden
Treaties of Switzerland
Treaties of Tajikistan
Treaties of Trinidad and Tobago
Treaties of Tunisia
Treaties of Turkey
Treaties of Ukraine
Treaties of the United Kingdom
Treaties of the United States
Treaties of Uzbekistan
1977 in Hungary
Treaties extended to the Netherlands Antilles
Treaties extended to Aruba
Treaties extended to Greenland
Treaties extended to the Faroe Islands
Treaties extended to Guernsey
Treaties extended to Gibraltar
Treaties extended to the Isle of Man